Super Saver (foaled March 18, 2007) is an American Thoroughbred racehorse who won the 2010 Kentucky Derby.

Pedigree
Super Saver's ancestors include damsire A.P. Indy, winner of the 1992 Belmont Stakes, 1957 Preakness Stakes winner Bold Ruler, 1964 Kentucky Derby winner Northern Dancer, and Triple Crown winners Secretariat (1973) and Seattle Slew (1977). He is also descended from superstud Mr. Prospector, whose descendants have won numerous Triple Crown races. His sire Maria's Mon, was also the sire of 2001 Kentucky Derby winner Monarchos, and his dam Supercharger is a full sister to the dam of Bluegrass Cat.

Racing career
Super Saver holds the stakes record for the Kentucky Jockey Club Stakes, by finishing a 1 on a fast main track in 1:42.83, eclipsing the stakes record of 1:43.14 established by Captain Steve in 1999.

Super Saver provided the third Derby win in a four-year period for jockey Calvin Borel, and the first win out of 25 entries for trainer Todd Pletcher.

Super Saver went off as 5:2 morning line favorite for the 2010 Preakness Stakes but finished eighth.

He then had another poor showing in the Haskell Invitational, and underwent a full veterinary exam, which showed that the colt had bruising and inflammation in all four of his cannon bones.

Stud career
Super Saver was retired from racing in October, 2010 and began his stud career at WinStar Farm in Versailles, Kentucky for the 2011 breeding season. That year, he shuttled to stand stud in Australia for the Southern Hemisphere breeding season. In 2017, he shuttled to Argentina. In 2019, Super Saver was acquired by the Turkish Jockey Club to stand stud in Turkey starting 2020.

Notable progeny include:

c = colt, f = filly

Racing statistics

Pedigree

References

External links
 Super Saver's pedigree and partial racing stats
 
 Super Saver's Derby win featured inside and on the cover of Stride Magazine

2007 racehorse births
Kentucky Derby winners
Racehorses bred in Kentucky
Racehorses trained in the United States
Thoroughbred family 1-xhttps://www.tjk.org/TR/Yetistiricilik/Static/Page/Aygirlar